Spencer House may refer to:

 Spencer House, Westminster, Greater London, England

United States
 Spencer House (Hartford, Connecticut), listed on the National Register of Historic Places (NRHP) in Hartford County
 Spencer House in Columbus, Georgia, former home of educator William Henry Spencer
 Spencer House (Lima, New York), listed on the NRHP in Livingston County
 Spencer House (Syracuse, New York), listed on the NRHP in Onondaga County
 Arthur Champlin Spencer and Margaret Fenton Spencer House, Portland, Oregon, listed on the NRHP in Multnomah County
 Spencer–Shippee–Lillbridge House, East Greenwich, Rhode Island, listed on the NRHP in Kent County
 William B. Spencer House, West Warwick, Rhode Island, listed on the NRHP in Kent County
 Spencer House (Bishopville, South Carolina), listed on the NRHP in Lee County